Jeypore Estate or Jeypore Zamindari was a Zamindari estate of the Madras Presidency in British India. Historically it was a kingdom known as Jeypore Kingdom, located in the highlands of the western interiors of the Kalinga region that existed from the mid-15th century to 1777 CE as a tributary state of the Gajapati Empire and following its decline retained various degrees of semi-independence until it became a vassal state of the British. It eventually formed a part of the linguistic Orissa Province in 1936 upon transfer from the Madras Province and became a part of the independent Union of India in 1947.

History

Vinayak Dev, a prince claiming descent from the mythical Suryavansh dynasty, took over the Jeypore area of the Eastern Ghats in 1453. The region was a hilly jungle, relatively unfertile, and populated mostly by aboriginal tribal peoples. The assimilation of tribal cult deities such as Majhighariani by Hindu invaders who sought to legitimize their rule and gain local support was characteristic of the region. Throughout most of the history of the dynasty, the family has principally worshipped Durga as their deity but simultaneously adopted the practice of adapting their devotions to those of the populace.

Vishwanath Dev, known as Maharajah Vishwanath Dev Gajapati, became the king of Nandapur in 1527. His realm grew such that it stretched as far as Bengal in the north and Ellore in the south, thus encompassing most of the territory once held by the Kalingas. He claimed the title of Gajapati which had been symbolically used by the powerful Gajapati dynasty before its end in 1541. It was during this reign that the capital city was briefly moved from Nandapur to Rayagada.

In 1565, the dynasty that had previously succeeded in forcing several "little kings" to be tributaries was itself forced into tributary status by the Shah of Golkunda.

In the mid-17th century, Maharajah Veer Vikram Dev, the eighth king, founded the city of Jeypore and moved his capital there. This move is recorded as taking place because astrologers had determined that the reason each of the preceding six rulers had each fathered only one son was because Nandapur was cursed; however, Schnepel notes that the gradual movement of Muslim invaders from Coastal Andhra into Orissa  probably influenced the decision. He died in 1669 and was succeeded by his only son, Krishna Dev.

Narayanapatna was the capital for several rulers, including Vishwambhara Dev II, whom the later panegyrist of the family (himself a member by marriage) said was an ardent follower of the Vaishnavite teachings of Chaitanya. That bhakti sect, which remains popular in Orissa to this day, formed a significant bond between the royal family and their Khond tribal subjects. The bond, however, could be tenuous and the dynasty ruled by consent of their notional subjects. Although the dynasty could rely on support from tribal warriors at times, Schnepel notes, as an example of shaky authority, the unrest in the "quasi-royal estate ... or 'little little kingdom" of Kalyansingpur. There the Khond people at one point sought to take advantage of a dispute over succession to appeal to the zamindari to appoint a king more local and approachable than the rulers at Jeypore. Schnepel notes of Bissam Cuttack, which was another area within the dynastic realm, that "powerful local rulers ... held a position which was nominally subordinate to the Jeypore kings but in fact was held independently of them".

British India

Vikram Dev I had joined other minor kings of the region in military opposition to the British colonial influence, leading to an attack by the British in 1775 which destroyed the fort at Jeypore. His son, Rama Chandra Dev II reversed the strategy, preferring co-operation to resistance and was favoured by the British for that reason. An additional factor in the vastly improved status of the dynasty was that the British fell out with Vizianagaram, another minor kingdom and long a rival of Jeypore. Flushed with confidence, Rama Chandra Dev arranged for a new capital and palace to be built at Jeypore, some distance away from the ruined fort.

Vikram Dev III (1889–1920), also known as His Highness Maharajah Sir Sri Sri Vikram Dev, was aged 14 when his father died, and he could not legally assume his responsibilities as ruler until he turned 28. His father had made arrangements for his education to be continued by a Dr. Marsh until that time. He was appointed a Knight Commander of the Order of the Indian Empire (KCIE) and granted the title of  His Highness for use by him and his successors. The British Raj granted him and his successors the right, from 1896, to use the title Maharajah, which was originally held by his ancestors. In 1893, he was married to the princess of Surguja State. He laid the foundation of the new palace known as Moti Mahal and was a liberal philanthropist, donating to many institutions that helped the public. He funded the construction of bridges over the Kolab and Indravati rivers. He died in 1920.

Ramchandra Dev IV (1920–1931), also known as His Highness Lieutenant Maharajah Ramchandra Dev, ascended the throne in 1920. He received the rank of a Lieutenant for his aid in the First World War by sending his navy's twelve ships and a small unit of his troops. The king died in Allahabad in 1931 without any issue and was succeeded by his uncle, who was also named Vikram Dev. Although he died unexpectedly and young, he is known for building the grand Hawa Mahal, or the Palace of Winds, on the beach of Visakhapatnam.

Vikram Dev IV (1931–1951), known as Sahitya Samrat HH Maharajah Vikram Dev, was crowned as the last king of the kingdom in 1931. He was a scholar, poet, playwright and leader. Being a prolific writer and proficient in five different languages—Telugu, Odia, Hindi, Sanskrit, and English—he earned the literary epithet of Sahitya Samrat, meaning the "Emperor of Literature", and a doctorate degree (D.Litt.) from Andhra University. He donated large amounts to Andhra University and served as the vice-chancellor of Andhra and Utkal universities. He married his daughter to an aristocratic family of Bihar and had his son-in-law Kumar Bidyadhar Singh Deo look after the affairs of his kingdom. His daughter gave birth to two sons and, as per traditional vedic rule, which suggests that the younger son belongs to the mother, eventually Ram Krishna Dev, being the younger prince, was appointed as the crown prince. He was the last king, as the kingdom merged into the newly formed Union of India.

Post-independence India

Ram Krishna Dev was the last king of the estate, as the titles were abolished in independent India soon after its creation with the first amendment to the constitution of India which amended the right to property as shown in Articles 19 and 31.

Ram Krishna Dev (1951–2006) became the titular king of Jeypore at his coronation in 1951, following the death of his grandfather. He married Rama Kumari Devi of Sitamau State, in Malwa, and had three children: a daughter, Maharajakumari Maya Vijay Lakshmi; and two sons, Yuvraj Shakti Vikram Dev and Rajkumar Vibhuti Bhusan Dev. The senior prince was married to Mayank Devi and had a daughter named Lalit Lavang Latika Devi; the junior prince was married to Sarika Devi of Nai Garhi royalty and had a son named Vishweshwar Chandrachud Dev. However, after the untimely deaths of both princes in 1997 and 2006, respectively, the right to the throne was disputed.

On 14 January 2013, Vishweshvar Dev was crowned as the Pretending Maharaja of Jeypore. The coronation took place on the auspicious day of Makar Sankranti and the royal rituals were performed by Bisweswar Nanda, a descendant of the early Raj Purohit lineage. On days of cultural importance and festivals, Vishweshvar appears as the Maharaja and conducts the royal ceremonial duties at Dussehra and Ratha Yatra.

Rulers 
The royal genealogical table of Jeypore mentions 25 kings.

1443–1675 (from Nandapur and Rayagada)

1675–1947 (from Jeypore)

See also
List of zamindari estates in Madras Presidency

References
Notes

Citations

Bibliography

Further reading
 
 

Zamindari estates
History of Odisha
History of Andhra Pradesh
Madras Presidency